The Queen's Anniversary Prizes for Higher and Further Education are a biennially awarded series of prizes awarded to universities and colleges in the further and higher education sectors within the United Kingdom. Uniquely it forms part of the British honours system, to date rounds have occurred in 1994, 1996, 1998, 2000, 2002, 2005, 2007, 2009, 2011, 2013, 2015, 2017, 2019 and 2021.

The Queen’s Anniversary Prizes recognise outstanding work by UK colleges and universities that shows quality and innovation and delivers real benefit to the wider world and public through education and training. The Prizes are the highest national Honour awarded in UK further and higher education.

History
The prize is awarded by the Royal Anniversary Trust, a registered charity founded in 1990 to develop a program to mark 1992 as the 40th year of Elizabeth II's reign as British monarch.  The program had these four goals:
celebrate the anniversary
establish an educational award
promote cultural awareness of the development of the United Kingdom's constitutional monarchy
to promote commerce, industry, and the advancement of education

Past winners have been recognized for work in a wide range of disciplines such as science, engineering, arts and the creative industries, education, the humanities, the environment and medicine. 

The next round of winners will be introduced in Autumn of 2023.

The educational award which the Royal Anniversary Trust established was the Queen's Anniversary Prize.

Prize winners

1994

1996

1998

2000

2002

2007

2015

2017

2019

See also
 Queen's Awards

References

External links
The Royal Anniversary Trust
Page from the Royal website

Educational awards in the United Kingdom
Elizabeth II